Wuntho is a historical Shan state in Upper Burma.

Wuntho may also refer to:

Wuntho Township, a third level administrative area in Katha District, Sagaing Region, Myanmar
Wuntho, Myanmar, the town in Wuntho Township